This article contains a list of organized baseball leagues.

International competition

Many international baseball events are coordinated by the baseball division of the World Baseball Softball Confederation, including the World Baseball Classic.

Americas
 Latin American Series
 Caribbean Series

United States

Youth Leagues & Major Organizations
American Legion Baseball, a youth program, headquartered in Indianapolis, Indiana.
Babe Ruth League, a youth program, headquartered in Hamilton, New Jersey.
Fellowship of Christian Athletes
Little League Baseball, a youth program, headquartered in Williamsport, Pennsylvania.
Pony Baseball, a youth program, headquartered in Washington, Pennsylvania.
Roy Hobbs Baseball, an over 30 amateur, adult men's baseball organization, headquartered out of Ft. Myers, FL, with national and international Leagues and Teams.

High school 
 In the US, the National Federation of State High School Associations (NFHS) and each state association governs the play of baseball at the high school level. The Federated Christian Athletic Association (FCAA) and state Christian associations oversee the play of baseball at the private Christian School level. Note, however, that a substantial number of Christian schools choose instead to join their state's general athletic association if the organization's rules allow it.

Baseball for the Disabled
Alternative Baseball, United States

Amateur baseball

Abalone League, United States
Ligue de Baseball Élite du Québec, Canada
New Brunswick Senior Baseball League, Canada
Nova Scotia Senior Baseball League, Canada
National Adult Baseball Association, United States
Cuban National Series
Brazilian Baseball Championship
All-American Amateur Baseball Association, United States
National Amateur Baseball Federation, United States

College baseball
NCAA conferences: Division I, Division II, Division III, and the College World Series (Div. I, Div. II, Div. III)
 NAIA conferences, including the NAIA Baseball World Series
 National Club Baseball Association (NCBA) conferences
National Junior College Athletic Association (NJCAA) conferences
 List of Collegiate Summer Baseball Leagues

Town Team Baseball 
Townball is a popular tradition in the Upper Midwest, with grassroots support at the local level.

Professional baseball 
 Major League Baseball (MLB) in the United States and Canada, made up of two component leagues;
National League
American League
 Minor League Baseball (MiLB) in the United States and Canada, comprising several levels and multiple component leagues;
AAA
International League
Pacific Coast League
AA
Eastern League
Southern League
Texas League
High-A
Midwest League
Northwest League
South Atlantic League
Single-A
California League
Carolina League
Florida State League
Rookie
Arizona Complex League
Florida Complex League
Fall baseball
Arizona Fall League

 Independent baseball leagues in the United States and Canada
American Association of Professional Baseball
Atlantic League of Professional Baseball
Empire Professional Baseball League
Frontier League
Pioneer League
Pacific Association of Professional Baseball Clubs
Pecos League
United Shore Professional Baseball League

Instructional Leagues
 California Winter League*

Latin America
Colombian Professional Baseball League* (LCBP), Colombia 
Cuban National Series* (CNS), Cuba 
Dominican Professional Baseball League* (LIDOM), Dominican Republic
Dominican Summer League (rookie), Dominican Republic
Mexican Pacific League*, Mexico
Liga Norte de México, Mexico
Mexican League (Triple-A), Mexico
Nicaraguan Professional Baseball League* (LNBP), Nicaragua
Panamanian Professional Baseball League* (LPBP or  Probeis), Panama
Liga de Béisbol Profesional Roberto Clemente* (LBPRC), Puerto Rico
Venezuelan Professional Baseball League* (LVBP), Venezuela

Defunct Leagues
 Federal League defunct since 1915, in the United States
 Union Association 
 Negro league baseball, defunct since 1958, in the United States
 All-American Girls Professional Baseball League, defunct since 1954, in the United States
 Canadian Baseball League
 Cuban League*
 Venezuelan Summer League
 North Country Baseball League

Asia 
 Asia Series
 Asia Winter Baseball League

Japan 
 Nippon Professional Baseball (NPB)
 Central League (major)
 Pacific League (major)
 Eastern League (minor)
 Western League (minor)
 Japanese Baseball League (Former League of Central League and Pacific League)
 Shikoku Island League Plus (Independent)
 Baseball Challenge League (Independent)
 Kansai Independent Baseball League (defunct)
 Japan Women's Baseball League (Women's)

South Korea 
 KBO League (major)
 KBO Futures League (minor)
 Korea Women's Baseball League (Women's)

Taiwan 
 Chinese Professional Baseball League (CPBL, major)
 Taiwan Major League (TML, major, defunct)

China 
 China National Baseball League
 China Baseball League (CBL), China (defunct)

Philippines 
 Baseball Philippines (defunct)
 Philippine Baseball League
 UAAP Baseball Championship

Other 
 Iran Baseball Championship, Iran
 Malaysian All-Star League Baseball, Malaysia, Brunei, Indonesia

Defunct Leagues
 Israel Baseball League

Europe
Baseball-Bundesliga, Austria
Croatian Baseball League, Croatia
Czech Baseball Extraliga, Czech Republic
Interlyga, Estonia, Latvia, Lithuania, Belarus, Russia
Baseball Finnish Championship Series, Finland
Division Élite, France
Baseball-Bundesliga, Germany
Greek Baseball League, Greece
Hungarian National Baseball League, Hungary
Irish Baseball League, Ireland
Italian Baseball League, Italy
Latvian Baseball League, Latvia
Lithuanian Baseball League, Lithuania
Honkbal Hoofdklasse, Netherlands
Ekstraliga Baseball, Poland
Bałtycka Liga Baseballu, Poland
Liga Atlântica de Basebol, Portugal
División de Honor de Béisbol, Spain
Elitserien, Sweden
National Baseball League, United Kingdom

Oceania 
 Australian Baseball League
 Greater Brisbane League, Australia
 New South Wales Major League, Australia
 Palau Major League, Palau

See also

Sport governing body
Regulation of sport
Outline of sports#General sports concepts
Baseball awards

References

Baseball-related lists
 
Baseball